Pectinimura is a genus of moths in the family Lecithoceridae.

Species
Pectinimura areola  Park, 2011
Pectinimura baryoma  (Diakonoff, 1954)
Pectinimura batubatuensis Park and Byun, 2008
Pectinimura brahmanica  Park, 2011
Pectinimura crassipalpis Park and Byun, 2008
Pectinimura crinalis Park and Byun, 2008
Pectinimura gilvicostata  Park, 2011
Pectinimura liberalis  (Diakonoff, 1954)
Pectinimura lutescens  (Diakonoff, 1954)
Pectinimura montiatilis Park and Byun, 2008
Pectinimura rhabdostoma  (Diakonoff, 1954)
Pectinimura singularis  Park, 2011

Etymology
The generic name is derived from Latin Pecten (meaning comb) and murus (meaning wall).

References

 
Lecithocerinae
Moth genera